DWDP (106.9 FM) Tropang Pinoy FM, is a radio station owned and operated by the Armed Forces of the Philippines through its Civil Affairs Group. Its studios and transmitter are located at the 2nd Floor, Municipal Gymnasium, Brgy. Bagumbayan, Roxas, Oriental Mindoro.

References

External links
Tropang Pinoy FM Page

Radio stations in Mindoro